Pat Marie Gagon (born December 12, 1955), known as Patti Miner, is an American actress, singer, author and entrepreneur most notable for her gospel country style of music. and hit solo single "Outlaw Blues".

Biography

Early life
Born in Utah to Marie and Fred Gagon, she was raised as a member of the Church of Jesus Christ of Latter-day Saints, along her three sisters: Utahna, Sharon, and Carol; and three brothers: Richard, Ira, and Fred Jr. She started singing in church at age of 6 and performed in community plays and appeared on television. In her high school, Orem High, she performed in the live band Peace and Happiness.

Education and early career
She later attended Brigham Young University and got degrees in psychology, musical theater, and education. She taught Bonneville Elementary School's 2nd grade class in the first televised Open Class Room. After graduation, she taught at the junior college and started the Dance Team and Cheer Squads at Utah Technical Center, (currently Utah Valley University).

Mrs. Utah
Miner went on to enter the Mrs. America pageant and won Mrs. Utah 1984.

Music career
Miner signed with the BMG label in 1993 and recorded the albums; Deep and Wide, Outlaw Blues and Gospel Album of Inspirational Favorites. She has three country music videos seen on television CMT, TNN and the Branson Networks, PattiMiner.com Website, and YouTube: Outlaw Blues, Here Goes Nothing, and Going Home. Miner toured the United States with her band and was a pre-act for Dan Seals. She signed with Platinum Plus Universal in 2007 and recorded the Never Give Up album in 2008. She performs with her current band Patti Miner and The River Bottom Boys.

Miner is known for her positive, upbeat, country style and currently she teaches how to sing for upcoming and new singers.

Acting career
She was in the movie Christmas Mission directed by Michael Schaertl as well as Porter Rockwell and Choke Canyon by Paramount Pictures.

Personal life
She is married to husband M. Vinson Miner and has three daughters and a son. Her nephew, SGT Shane Fansler, is serving in Afghanistan with the elite 3rd Brigade, 10th Mountain Division.

Discography
 Outlaw Blues
 Here Goes Nothing
 Going Home

Filmography
 Christmas Mission

Books
 Interviews for Pageant, Business and Social Situations
 Popularity and the Five Dimensions of Charm and Beauty
 Film and Stage Modeling

References

External links
  
 Patti Miner - Official Website

1955 births
Living people
American country singer-songwriters
American women country singers
American Latter Day Saints
American women pop singers
Brigham Young University alumni
People from Orem, Utah
Actresses from Utah
Singer-songwriters from Utah